The following lists events that happened during 1801 in Australia.

Incumbents
Monarch - George III

Governors
Governors of the Australian colonies:
Governor of New South Wales – Captain Philip King

Events
 14 September – John Macarthur takes part in a duel with his commanding officer, Lieutenant Colonel William Paterson. Paterson is severely wounded in the shoulder, and Macarthur is arrested the next day. Governor King offers to release him on Norfolk Island but Macarthur refuses and is sent to England to be court martialed.
 The schooner Cumberland (28 tons) is launched in Sydney. The vessel was purchased by the government and became the first armed vessel belonging to the colony.

Exploration and settlement
 January – Brig Harbinger, under John Black, is the second vessel to sail through Bass Strait en route to Port Jackson.
 27 May – The French cartographic expedition of Nicolas Baudin sights Cape Hamelin.

Births
 21 January – John Batman, founder of Victoria (died 1839)

Deaths
 8 June – Thomas Vasse, French sailor

References

 
Years of the 19th century in Australia